Ashitha (Malayalam: അഷിത; 5 April 1956 – 27 March 2019) was an Indian writer of Malayalam literature, best known for her short stories, poems and translations. She helped popularize haiku poems in Malayalam through her translations. She was a recipient of the Kerala Sahitya Akademi Award for Story and other honours including the Padmarajan Award, Lalithambika Anterjanam Smaraka Sahitya Award and Edasseri Award.

Biography

Ashitha was born on 5 April 1956 in Pazhayannur in Trichur district of Kerala to Kazhangottu Balachandran Nair and Thekkekarupath Thankamani Amma. She completed her schooling from Delhi and Bombay and obtained her graduate and master's degrees in English literature from Maharaja's College, Ernakulam.

Ashitha was married to K. V. Ramankutty and had a daughter, Uma Praseedha. She was diagnosed with cancer in 2013 and was undergoing treatment when she died on 27 March 2019, at 62, survived by her husband, daughter and son-in-law.

Legacy 
Ashitha, who authored over 20 books, was known to have portrayed her life experiences through short stories and poems. Counted among the most prominent women writers in Malayalam after Kamala Surayya and best known for her short stories, she translated a number of works of Alexander Pushkin and Jalāl ad-Dīn Muhammad Rūmī as well as many haikus. She also adapted the Ramayana, Bhagavatam, Jataka tales and Aithihyamala for children. Her biography, Athu Njanayirunnu (That Was I), was published by Shihabuddin Poythumkadavu.

Awards
Ponnani Edasseri Smaraka Samithi selected Ashitha's work, Vismaya Chhihnangal for an Edasseri Award in 1986 and she received the Lalithambika Anterjanam Smaraka Sahitya Award in 1994. Her short story anthology, Thathagatha, fetched her the Padmarajan Award in 2000. Kerala Sahitya Akademi selected Ashithayude Kathakal, another short story anthology, for its annual award for story in 2015. She was also a recipient of Ankanam Award and Thoppil Ravi Foundation Award.

Selected works

Short stories

Novels and novellas

Poetry

Children's literature

Translations

Memoirs

Others

In compilations

See also 

 List of Malayalam-language authors by category
 List of Malayalam-language authors

References

Further reading

External links 
 
 
 
 

1956 births
2019 deaths
People from Thrissur district
Poets from Kerala
Indian women short story writers
Indian women poets
Malayalam-language writers
Malayalam poets
Malayalam short story writers
Maharaja's College, Ernakulam alumni
21st-century Indian translators
21st-century Indian short story writers
21st-century Indian poets
21st-century Indian women writers
21st-century Indian writers
Women writers from Kerala
Indian women translators
20th-century Indian novelists
20th-century Indian short story writers
20th-century Indian poets
21st-century Indian novelists
Deaths from cancer in India
20th-century translators
20th-century Indian women